The Malpas tunnel carries the Canal du Midi under the d'Ensérune hill in Hérault, France. Excavated in 1679, it was Europe's first navigable canal tunnel and is a monument to the determination of Pierre-Paul Riquet, the chief engineer. It is located in the commune of Nissan-lez-Ensérune near to the archaeological site Oppidum d'Ensérune.

There was great disappointment when the works reached the hill d'Ensérune. A few metres of digging in hard rock revealed a very brittle sandstone subject to slippage. Colbert, the prime minister, halted the works when he was made aware of the situation.  The portal was blocked and the workings re-sited. Riquet's detractors took advantage of this situation to impede the project. Colbert announced that he would send royal commissioners to decide the canal's future. The advice of the Chevalier de Clerville, architect to Louis XIV, was to cross the river Aude rather than tunnel through the hill. Riquet, however, maintained his preference for a tunnel because of the extra problems that crossing the Aude would create. 

Riquet's response was to ask his master mason, Pascal de Nissan, to continue tunneling in secret despite the risk of collapse. In less than eight days the tunnel was complete with a concrete ceiling throughout. The tunnel is 165m long with an arch 8m above the canal's surface, and removed the necessity for an extra lock.

By the time the Malpas Tunnel was excavated in the seventeenth century, the hill had already for several centuries been the site of a tunnel, dug in the Middle Ages, to drain the Étang de Montady. This pre-existing tunnel is said to have been Riquet's inspiration for the Malpas Tunnel. In the nineteenth century, a third tunnel was excavated, passing through the Hill d'Ensérune beneath the Malpas tunnel to house the Béziers to Narbonne railway line.

References

Further reading

See also 
 Canal du Midi
 Oppidum d'Ensérune
 Canal tunnel
 Rove Tunnel

External links 
 Le tunnel de Malpas in French
 La percée de Malpas in French
 Tunnel du Malpas in French
 Le Tunnel de Malpas in French

Canal tunnels in France
Canal du Midi
Tunnels completed in 1679
1679 establishments in France